HJI may refer to:

 Hairdressers Journal International
 Haji language, spoken on Sumatra
 Harkat-ul-Jihad al-Islami